Adscita italica is a moth of the family Zygaenidae. It is found in mainland Italy and on Sicily, as well as in Turkey.

Taxonomy
It was formerly treated as a subspecies of Adscita alpina.

References

Procridinae
Moths described in 1937
Moths of Europe